Travels of a Republican Radical in Search of Hot Water is a collection of essays by H.G. Wells written in 1939. It is best known for the following description:

1939 non-fiction books
Books by H. G. Wells
Essay collections
Penguin Books books